In geomorphology, geography and geology, a bench or benchland is a long, relatively narrow strip of relatively level or gently inclined land that is bounded by distinctly steeper slopes above and below it. Benches can be of different origins and created by very different geomorphic processes.

First, the differential erosion of rocks or sediments of varying hardness and resistance to erosion can create benches. Earth scientists called such benches "structural benches." Second, other benches are narrow fluvial terraces created by the abandonment of a floodplain by a river or stream and entrenchment of the river valley into it. Finally, a bench is also the name of a narrow flat area often seen at the base of a sea cliff that was created by waves or other physical or chemical erosion near the shoreline. These benches are typically referred to as either "coastal benches," "wave-cut benches," or "wave-cut platforms."

In mining, a bench is a narrow, strip of land cut into the side of an open-pit mine. These step-like zones are created along the walls of an open-pit mine for access and mining.

See also

References

External links

Landforms
Fluvial landforms
Geomorphology
Riparian zone